Thomas Auckland Hall (19 August 1930 – 21 April 1984)  was an English amateur cricketer who played first-class cricket for  Derbyshire from 1949 to 1952, for Somerset from 1953 to 1954 and for Marylebone Cricket Club (MCC) between 1951 and 1955.

Cricket career
Hall was born at Darlington, County Durham and was educated at Uppingham School where he captained the first XI in 1948. He joined Derbyshire in the 1949 season playing two games for the second XI and made his first-class debut against Nottinghamshire in August 1949 when he neither scored nor took a wicket. However he returned for the first half of the 1950 season and against Surrey  batting 9th man  made 52, the highest score in a total of 147. During the season, he took 5 wickets for 60 against Hampshire. In the 1951 season he took 36 wickets at 23.69 with 5 for 57 against Leicestershire. In non-county matches that year, he took the wicket of Len Hutton three times in one week, once for Marylebone Cricket Club (MCC) and twice in a match for Gentlemen v Players and turned out to be Hutton's nemesis in many subsequent matches.  He played two county games for Derbyshire in the 1952 season and otherwise played for MCC and Free Foresters.

In 1953 Hall joined Somerset. He took 58 wickets in the season and made his top score of 69  against Northamptonshire. He came in when the side were 129 behind with two wickets to go and played an  unfinished partnership with Harold Gimblett. He played one game for Somerset in 1954 and then appeared for the Royal Air Force cricket team and Combined Services. In 1955 he played again for the RAF, and also took 5 for 50  for MCC against Yorkshire. From then on his first-class games were for Free Foresters against the universities and in 1958 he took 5 for 62  against Oxford University.

Hall was a  right-arm fast-medium bowler and took 183 first-class wickets at an average of 27.91 and a best performance of 5 for 50. He was a right-hand batsman and played 103 innings in 66 first-class matches at an average of 11.15 and a top score of 69 not out.

Hall was a member of the crew of Timothy Colman's Crossbow, which broke the world speed sailing record in 1972.

Hall died at Arlesey, Bedfordshire at the age of 53.

References

External links
 

1930 births
1984 deaths
People educated at Uppingham School
Derbyshire cricketers
Somerset cricketers
Marylebone Cricket Club cricketers
English cricketers
English male sailors (sport)
Free Foresters cricketers
Combined Services cricketers
Gentlemen cricketers
Sportspeople from Darlington
Cricketers from County Durham
People from Arlesey
Norfolk cricketers
T. N. Pearce's XI cricketers